The Texas Rodeo Hall of Fame is a hall of fame in Pecos, Texas, dedicated to the sport of rodeo.

History

In 2004, the Texas Rodeo Hall of Fame held its first induction. They used the courtyard of the West of the Pecos Museum. The hall of fame has inducted individuals from all of the rodeo events and from the categories used in the ProRodeo Hall of Fame, and others.

Present day
The hall of fame inducts individuals from the West of the Pecos rodeo as well as the entire country. The hall of fame is located in the Old T&P Train Depot at 100 East Dot Stafford Street. There are exhibits from the hall of fame in the museum. The hall of fame can be visited in the museum during its operating hours.

Inductees

 Walt Arnold
 Pam Perner Goodwin
 Wacey Cathey
 Mary Dale "Sis" Miller
 David Lynn Hess
 Skipper & Wanda Driver
 Earl William Acton
 John Rae Powell
 Clark McEntire
 Jackie Bob Cox
 Travis "Shot" Branham
 Guy Allen
 James Allen
 Jim Bob Altizer
 Jiggs Barfield
 Wanda Harper Bush
 Dale "Tuffy" Cooper
 Roy Cooper (rodeo cowboy)
 C.F. "Sonny" Davis
 Jim Davis
 Quail Dobbs
 Jewel Duncan
 James Pruett Espy, Sr.
 Billie Ann Evans
 J.W. "Bub" Evans
 Arnold Felts
 Dan Fisher
 Troy Fort
 Charles Good
 Snooky Griffith
 Eva Mae Wilken Holleyman
 John D. Holleyman
 Buck Jackson
 Sherry Johnson
 Phil Lyne
 Toots Mansfield
 Tyler Mangus (2018)
 Curtis McElroy
 Peppy McKinney
 Shawn McMullan
 Margaret Owens Montgomery
 Buddy Neal
 Walton Poage
 Louis Powers
 Jack Riggs
 Ronny Sewalt (2018)
 Dude Smith (2018)

See also
List of museums in West Texas

References

External links
 Official Website
 West of the Pecos Museum
 Pecos Rodeo

2004 establishments in Texas
American West museums in Texas
Sports museums in Texas
Cowboy halls of fame
Sports halls of fame
Halls of fame in Texas
Awards established in 2004
Museums established in 2004
Lists of sports awards